Franklinville is an unincorporated community and census-designated place in McHenry County, Illinois, United States. It was named a CDP before the 2020 census, at which time it had a population of 38.

Geography
The community is situated in the heart of Seneca Township at the junction of Franklinville Road (County Highway T-68) and Garden Valley-Perkins Road. A minor middle branch of the Kishwaukee River — called Franklinville Creek by some — crosses the community in a northeast-to-southwest direction. In terms of geographic coordinates, the community is located at  (42.2766886, -88.5112025) In terms of the Public Land Survey System, Franklinville is divided between Sections 22 and 23, Township 44 North, Range 6 East of the Third Principal Meridian.

Demographics

2020 census

Points of interest
Franklinville is the site of the old Seneca Township Hall (built circa 1885) and the Franklinville cemetery. The modern office of Seneca Township is located approximately three-quarters of a mile west of the crossroads at 16506 Garden Valley Road (post office: Woodstock, IL 60098).

See also
Seneca Township

Notes and references

Census-designated places in Illinois
Census-designated places in McHenry County, Illinois
Chicago metropolitan area